Illinois Route 127 is a north–south highway in central and southern Illinois. Its southern terminus is at Illinois Route 3 near Olive Branch and its northern terminus at Interstate 55, along with the southern terminus of Illinois Route 48 in Raymond.

Route description 
Illinois 127 parallels U.S. Route 51 for its entire length. U.S. 51 is generally a few miles to the east of Illinois 127, though they never cross. After leaving Alexander County, the route passes through each of the next seven county seats.

Illinois 127 overlaps Illinois Route 146 near Jonesboro, Illinois Route 149 in Murphysboro,  Illinois Route 13 from Pinckneyville to Murphysboro, U.S. Route 50 in Carlyle, Illinois Route 140 near Greenville, Illinois Route 16 in Hillsboro and wrong-way with Illinois 48 at its northern terminus. (Illinois 48 is a northbound route at the same time Illinois 127 is marked southbound).

History 
SBI Route 127 originally ran from Raymond to Carlyle. In 1937 it was extended to Nashville, replacing Route 153.  By 1939 it had been extended to Pinckneyville. In 1944, it was extended west to U.S. Route 66, and south to its current terminus.

A section of Illinois Route 127 south of Carbondale has been designated as the Shawnee Hills Wine Trail by the Illinois state legislature, in commemoration of the region's importance to the Illinois wine industry.

Major intersections

References

 
127
Transportation in Alexander County, Illinois
Transportation in Union County, Illinois
Transportation in Jackson County, Illinois
Transportation in Perry County, Illinois
Transportation in Washington County, Illinois
Transportation in Clinton County, Illinois
Transportation in Bond County, Illinois
Transportation in Montgomery County, Illinois